The 1944 United States Senate special election in Massachusetts was held on November 7, 1944. Republican Governor Leverett Saltonstall was elected to finish the term of Henry Cabot Lodge, Jr., who had resigned from the Senate to serve in World War II.

Background
Incumbent U.S. Senator Henry Cabot Lodge, Jr. resigned February 3, 1944 to return to active duty in the U.S. Army during World War II. To fill the vacancy until a successor could be duly elected, Republican Governor Leverett Saltonstall appointed Sinclair Weeks on February 8, 1944.  A special election was scheduled on November 7.

Republican primary

Candidates
Leverett Saltonstall, Governor of Massachusetts since 1939

Results
Governor Saltonstall was unopposed for the Republican nomination.

Democratic primary

Candidates
 John H. Corcoran, Mayor of Cambridge since 1942
 Joseph A. Langone, Jr., former State Senator
 Joseph Lee, former Boston School Committee member
 Richard M. Russell, former United States Representative and Mayor of Cambridge

Results

General election

Candidates
 John H. Corcoran, Mayor of Cambridge since 1942 (Democratic)
 Bernard G. Kelly, nominee for Secretary of the Commonwealth in 1942 and Auditor in 1940 (Socialist Labor)
 E. Tallmadge Root, nominee for Governor of Massachusetts in 1940 (Prohibition)
Leverett Saltonstall, Governor of Massachusetts since 1939 (Republican)

Results

Though he was entitled to be seated immediately upon the certification of the election, Saltonstall did not take office until January 4, 1945, when his term as Governor ended.

See also 
 United States Senate elections, 1944

References

Massachusetts
1944
Massachusetts 1944
1944 Massachusetts elections
Special elections to the 78th United States Congress
United States Senate 1874